The Merchant Marine Korean Service Medal (Ribbon) is a decoration of the United States Merchant Marine awarded for service during the Korean War.

History 
The decoration was created by the United States Maritime Administration on July 24, 1956.

Conditions 
The decoration is awarded to officers and men for service aboard merchant vessels flying the American flag in waters adjacent to Korea between June 30, 1950 and September 30, 1953, during the Korean War.

Prior to 1992, the Merchant Marine Korean Service Medal was a ribbon-only decoration. Later, a medal was affixed to the ribbon. The following is a design note: "the torii gate and taeguk are traditionally associated with Korea. The ship's chain alludes to maritime service."

See also 
 Awards and decorations of the United States government
 Awards and Decorations of the United States Maritime Administration
 Awards and decorations of the United States Merchant Marine
 Awards and decorations of the United States military

References

External links

Laws Establishing Merchant Marine Medals

Awards and decorations of the United States Merchant Marine
Awards established in 1956
1956 establishments in the United States
Military awards and decorations of the Korean War
Military history of the United States during the Korean War
United States service medals